Pexicopia karachiella is a moth of the family Gelechiidae. It was described by Hans Georg Amsel in 1968 and is found in western Pakistan.

References

Moths described in 1968
Pexicopia